Curtis Fuller Volume 3 is an album by American trombonist Curtis Fuller recorded in 1957 and released on the Blue Note label as BLP 1583.

Reception

The Allmusic review by Lee Bloom stated: "This third solo recording for Fuller on the Blue Note label is stronger than its predecessors, especially in showcasing the trombonist's writing talents... This recording firmly established Curtis Fuller as a serious, mature voice on his instrument".

Track listing
All compositions by Curtis Fuller, except as indicated
 "Little Messenger" - 6:21
 "Quantrale" - 6:13
 "Jeanie" - 6:49
 "Carvon" - 6:59
 "Two Quarters of a Mile" - 6:33
 "It's Too Late Now" (Burton Lane, Alan Jay Lerner) - 6:54

Personnel 
Curtis Fuller - trombone
Art Farmer - trumpet
Sonny Clark - piano
George Tucker - bass
Louis Hayes - drums

References 

1961 albums
Albums produced by Alfred Lion
Albums recorded at Van Gelder Studio
Blue Note Records albums
Curtis Fuller albums